Video gaming in India is an emerging market since India is experiencing strong growth in online gaming, making it one of the top gaming markets in the world. Over the past few decades, the Indian gaming industry has gone from close to nonexistent in the 1990s to one of the top markets globally in the late 2010s. As of 2021, it is one of the top five mobile gaming markets in the world. By the third quarter of 2020 there were more than 7.4 billion mobile game downloads. The industry is projected to reach 510 million gamers by 2022.

Video game development in India is still underdeveloped compared to other Asian countries, such as China and South Korea. However, the growing amount of gamers in India has attracted interest from global video game companies. As investments from international video game companies continue to rise, more global game studios such as Ubisoft and Microsoft Games have opened offices in India. Local Indian game studios are also steadily growing. India went from 15 game development studios to 275 from 2009 to 2021. The growing presence of video games in India has led to bans and regulations on gaming imposed by the Indian government.

History

Growth of gaming devices 
In India, video games used to only be available at video game parlours, where games came in the form of coin-operated machines. In the 1990s, 8-bit NES clones that ran on cartridges were introduced to India. Each cartridge contained many classic games like Super Mario Bros or Contra. These game consoles allowed people to play games inside their homes, which sparked the initial growth of the popularity of video games in India.

In the mid-to-late-90s, sales in personal computers and the Sony PlayStation skyrocketed and replaced the 8-bit consoles. Players were also now able to download games like The Sims on PCs rather than purchase cartridges. The PC remains one of the most popular devices for games today, with 87% of surveyed gamers preferring it over mobile gaming. The PlayStation also remains fairly popular, though not as much as the PC since console games tend to cost more.

In the 2000s, mobile devices became more common in India. This caused a huge growth in gaming because most smartphones had access to mobile games. In 2020, there were 696 million smartphone users, compared to 2013 where there were 76 million users. India expects to reach 970 million users by 2025.

Growth of the gaming industry 
Cyber cafés, which are cafés offering public Internet access, contributed to the growth of India's video game market. In 2006, there were over 100,000 cyber cafés, 40% of which were used to play online games. In 2008, there were 180,000 cyber cafés, but by 2017, the number declined to 50,000. One of primary reasons for decline was the IT Act, which caused licensing issues and other restrictions.

Video game studios have been sprouting in India, most notably in Bangalore, which is often called the "Silicon Valley of India." In 2009, there were only 15 game development studios in India. As of 2021, there are 15,000 game developers and 275 game developing companies in India. Technology and gaming companies began investing in India's gaming industry after seeing its potential. Large game conventions began to be hosted in India when its industry was projected to earn  in 2014. Indian colleges also began offering game design and development courses to students, which led to younger generations joining the industry and an increase in game developers.

Local industry

Video games produced in India 
The first PlayStation 2 video game completely created in India, Hanuman: Boy Warrior, was based on Hindu mythology and followed the story of the Hindu God Hanuman. This game was developed by Aurona Technologies Limited, a gaming studio located in Hyderabad. The release of the game was controversial because it was criticized for disrespecting the Hindu religion. Hindu leader, Rajan Zed, was vocal in the criticism of the game.

Hanuman was later followed by Don 2: The Game, a tie-in to the film of the same name. Besides being released for the PlayStation 2 (also serving as the final PAL region release for the console overall), Don 2 was also released for the PlayStation Portable.

Nowadays, many studios in India derive most of their income from outsourcing to foreign companies. Though most of the studios work on mobile games, there are a few working on projects on PC and consoles, such as Bangalore-based Tentworks Interactive. Tentworks Interactive recently revealed India's first major PC game title, City Block Builder, that is set for release in 2021 at the EGX gaming expo. City Block Builder won Best of EGX (2019) in London by Cultured Vultures Magazine, marking the first time that an Indian title has won such an award at a foreign expo.

Integration of Indian history and culture 
The indie game scene in India has been growing recently as more studios develop games that draw on Indian history and culture. Asura, a PC game created in 2017 by Ogre Head Studio, draws on aspects of Indian mythology. The game is not only popular in India, but also in the U.S., China, and Japan. Asura won the Game of the Year award at the 2017 NASSCOM Game Development Conference.

Holy Cow Productions and Nodding Heads Games, two Indian-based game studios, are also working to create games drawing on Indian history and culture. In July 2020, prime minister Narenda Modi called for more video games based on Indian culture as they had "huge potential" to promote national pride. A month later, Nodding Heads Games released Raji: An Ancient Epic, an adventure game inspired by Indian folklore, on the Nintendo Switch and received positive reviews globally.

Political and social commentary 
Studio Oleomingus, a gaming studio based in Chala, Gujarat, creates video games that comment on India's history and politics. The games make use of surreal and fantastical visuals and environments to evoke Indian children's literature.

Missing-Game for a Cause is a role-playing video game produced in India by Leena Kejriwal and Satyajit Chakraborty. The game's storyline allows players to experience life of a victim of human trafficking. The game was created to raise awareness about human trafficking in India, where there are 98 million victims of human trafficking. The game won NASSCOM's Indie Game of the Year Award in 2016 and has over 500,000 downloads.

Mobile gaming 
Mobile gaming in India has grown exponentially because of inexpensive smartphones, high-speed 4G internet connection, and convenient access. As of 2019, India is one of the top five mobile gaming markets in the world in terms of number of users.

PlayerUnknown's Battlegrounds Mobile (PUBG Mobile), a battle royale game published by Tencent Games, became the most popular mobile game in India in 2018. As of January 2020, India became PUBG Mobile'''s largest market in the world with 175 million downloads, which is 24% of all PUBG Mobile players worldwide.

During the COVID-19 pandemic, there was an increase in the number of Indian mobile gamers because of the stay-at-home orders. From April 2019 and June 2020 when COVID occurred, the Google Play Store saw a 51% increase in mobile game downloads and the iOS App Store saw a 20% increase.

Esports
In February 2021, the hashtag #RecognizeEsportsInIndia trended on Twitter, which caught the attention of the Indian government. A few weeks later, the Indian Olympic Association (IOA) announced esports as an official sport and the Esports Federation of India (ESFI) as its governing body. Before this announcement, esports were considered a demonstration sport in India.

At Asian Games 2018, Tirth "gcttirth" Mehta from Bhuj, Gujarat won India's first esports medal for Hearthstone, one of the six game titles selected for the competition. He bagged the bronze medal at this demonstration event. Karan “Jin Kazama” Manganani from Jaipur was placed 4th for Clash Royale at the same tournament. These two, along with Moinuddin Amdani and Abhinav Tejan, have been recognized by the ESFI as the top 4 esports athletes and will represent the country at global competitions.

In February 2022, INOX Leisure partnered with Esports Federation of India (ESFI) to exclusively host and promote ESFI tournaments in its cinemas across the country. 

Esports revenue in India grew by 29% from ₹750 crore in 2020 to ₹970 crore in 2021. The number of players doubled to 600,000 in 2021, while the viewership grew to 2 million hours in the same year. The number of players is projected to reach 1 million in 2022, of which 20 percent would be female. 

 BGMI Launch Party 
After Krafton, a South Korean video game company, launched Battlegrounds Mobile India (BGMI) in India, they hosted BGMI Launch Party, the first BGMI esports tournament to celebrate the game's official release. The tournament took place from July 8, 2021, to July 9, 2021. It was exclusive to the most popular Indian gamers, such as Adii "Dynamo" Sawant and Chetan "Kronten" Chandgude, split into 18 teams of 4. The event was live-streamed on the official BGMI Facebook and YouTube pages and reached a peak of 547,888 viewers at a time, deeming it a success.

On both days, teams played three matches on the game maps Erangel, Miramar, and Vikendi in that order. On the first day, Team Snax won all three matches, taking the lead with 76 points. On the second day, Team Snax won the first match, but Team Jonathan and Team Maxtern won the second and third matches respectively.

Team Snax, made up of players Raj "Snax" Varma, Samir "Kratos" Choubey, Randeep "Attanki" Bhallar, and Daljit "Daljit SK" Singh, emerged in first place with a total of 127 points and received  of the  prize pool. Team Kronten was the runner-up with a total of 63 points.

 BGMI India Series 
Following the success of the Launch Party, Krafton will be hosting its first BGMI India Series esports tournament. The tournament was supposed to start in July 2021, but it was delayed due to increasing hackers. The India Series is open to all Indian residents who are at least 16 years old and platinum-ranked or higher. BGMI is currently only available on Android devices.

A total of  makes up the prize pool. The prize money will be distributed to the top 16 teams with the first place team earning . There will also be an additional award for the team with the most kills and four individual awards to recognize outstanding players: MVP, The Lone Ranger (longest survival time), The Rampage Freak (most kills), and The Redeemer (most revivals).  

The series will have five stages: In-Game Qualifiers, Online Qualifiers (consisting of three rounds), Quarter-Finals, Semi-Finals, and Grand Finale. There will also be a Loser Bracket for teams that did not advance after the Quarter-Finals for another chance to qualify for the Semi-Finals. In each stage except the In-Game Qualifiers, the remaining teams will be split into groups, and the best number of teams in each group will qualify for the next round. The tournament will span over three months beginning with the qualifying events.

 Government Regulations 

 Bans on Chinese games 
In March 2019, PUBG Mobile was banned in the Indian state of Gujarat after the local government decided the game was "too addicting and violent" and a distraction during exam season. A number of students were caught playing the game and arrested. After the exam season ended, the ban was lifted in some cities.

Amidst the ongoing 2020 China–India skirmishes, on June 29, 2020, Mobile Legends: Bang Bang was officially banned in India along with other 58 Chinese apps like TikTok, UC Browser, and Xender due to privacy concerns. Mobile Legends: Bang Bang was one of top grossing mobile games in India. On September 2, 2020, the Indian government banned PUBG Mobile, PUBG Mobile Lite, and over 100 other Chinese apps. They believed the apps were "stealing and surreptitiously transmitting user data in an unauthorized manner to servers which have locations outside India." India prohibited the use of PUBG Mobile under the Information Technology (IT) Act Section 69A. India is one of several countries to have banned PUBG mobile in 2020, including China, Pakistan, Afghanistan, Korea, Jordan, Nepal, Israel, and Iraq.

In response to the 2020 ban on PUBG mobile, Krafton, a South Korean video game company, created Battlegrounds Mobile India. This game differs slightly from the original PUBG mobile game due to cosmetic changes, but eliminates governmental concerns about the previous app being created in China. Battlegrounds Mobile India'' does not allow players under the age of 18 to play more than three hours a day without parental consent. Minors are also not allowed to spend over 7000 INR a day on the game’s store.

Bans on online wagering games 
The governments in several Indian states have imposed bans on online gaming which involve wagering money. In Andhra Pradesh in 2020, online gaming regulations were created in response to concerns about gamers resorting to suicide because of financial debts from gaming. In 2021, the Tamil Nadu government announced a ban (which was subsequently deemed unconstitutional by the Madras High Court) on online versions of games of skill like Chess, Trivia, Fantasy, Rummy and Poker. In Karnataka, a hub of the Indian tech industry, a ban on online betting games was also proposed in 2021. Karnataka's ban has been extended to online games that require users to pay an entry fee. Due to Karnataka’s importance in the Indian technology and gaming field, this ban has raised concerns about how it affects on the Indian gaming industry and triggered protests against it.

Piracy
India has the most pirated games globally. Before India's game industry upsurge, mainstream video game publishers did not recognize India as a serious market. This led to the spread of pirated, secondhand, and knock-off cartridge games because international game companies had little control in India. The average consumer primarily played pirated games because of its low cost and the lack of access to original games. However, now that PC and console gaming are more popular in India and games on those platforms cannot be pirated, piracy rates have been steadily decreasing. Now, many people prefer original games because of its access to software updates and different game modes.

See also
 Sports in India 
 Fantasy sport in India - Over view of Fantasy sport in India

References

Bibliography
 Bendik Stang, Morten A. Osterholt et Erik Hoftun, The Book of Games, Volume 2 : The Ultimate Reference on PC & Video Games, Book of Games, 2007, p. 397 
  Maitrayee Deka, (2016). Bazaars and Video Games in India. BioScope: South Asian Screen Studies. 7 (2)

Indian culture